Abbeyland is a townland in County Westmeath, Ireland.

Abbeyland is one of 14 townlands of the civil parish of Multyfarnham in the barony of Corkaree in the Province of Leinster. 

The neighbouring townlands are: Multyfarnham to the north and east
Rathganny to the south and Ballynaclonagh to the west and north–west.

In the 1911 census of Ireland there were 2 listings for Multyfarnham Friary in Abbeyland; one for 11 Franciscan clergymen and lay-brothers and one for 20 students aged between 14 and 22 years.

References

External links
Abbeyland at The Placenames Database of Ireland

Townlands of County Westmeath